The 2022 National Football League, known for sponsorship reasons as the Allianz National Football League, is the 91st staging of the National Football League (NFL), an annual Gaelic football tournament for Gaelic Athletic Association county teams. Thirty-one county teams from the island of Ireland, plus London, compete; Kilkenny do not participate.

Format

League structure

In the top division, Division 1, teams compete to become the National Football League (NFL) champions. The top two teams qualify for the NFL Final, with the winners crowned NFL champions.

The 2022 National Football League consists of four divisions of eight teams. Each team plays every other team in its division once. Two points are awarded for a win and one point for a draw.

Teams compete for promotion and relegation to a higher or lower league. In Divisions 2, 3 and 4, the first and second-places teams are promoted, while the bottom two teams of divisions 1, 2 and 3 are relegated .

Tiebreakers for league ranking
As per the Official GAA Guide - Part 1 - Section 6.21 - 

If two teams in the same group are equal on points on completion of the league phase, the following tie-breaking criteria are applied:
Where two teams only are involved - the outcome of the meeting of the two teams in the previous game in the Competition;

If three or more teams in the same group are equal on points on completion of the league phase, the following tie-breaking criteria are applied:
Scoring Difference (subtracting the total scores against from total scores for);
Highest Total Score For;
A Play-Off.

In the event that two teams or more finish with equal points, but have been affected by a disqualification, loss of game on a proven objection, retirement or walkover, the tie shall be decided by the following means:
Score Difference from the games in which only the teams involved, (teams tied on points), have played each other. (subtracting the total Scores Against from total Scores For)
Highest Total Score For, in which only the teams involved, have played each other, and have finished equal in (i)
A Play-Off

Division 1

Table

Matches

Round 1

Round 2

Round 3

Round 4

Round 5

Round 6

Round 7

Final

Division 2

Table

Matches

Round 1

Round 2

Round 3

Round 4

Round 5

Round 6

Round 7

Final

Division 3

Table

Matches

Round 1

Round 2

Round 3

Round 4

Round 5

Round 6

Round 7

Final

Division 4

Table

Matches
London returned for the first time since March 2020, due to the impact of the COVID-19 pandemic on Gaelic games.

Round 1

Round 2

Round 3

Round 4

Round 5

Round 6

Round 7

Final

Armagh indiscipline
Armagh were involved in disciplinary incidents following two of their league games. Colm O'Rourke described Armagh as the "common denominator" after two earlier brawls in 2022, making this their third of the year.

See also
Armagh v Galway (2022 All-Ireland Senior Football Championship), a sequel to Armagh's league indiscipline

References

External links
 Kerry exports representing other counties this season

 
National Football League (Ireland) seasons